It is a custom among religious Jewish communities for a weekly Torah portion to be read  during Jewish prayer services on Monday, Thursday, and Saturday. The full name, Parashat HaShavua, is popularly abbreviated to parashah (also parshah  or parsha), and is also known as a Sidra or Sedra .

The parashah is a section of the Torah (Five Books of Moses) used in Jewish liturgy during a particular week. There are 54 parshas, or parashiyot in Hebrew, and the full cycle is read over the course of one Jewish year.

Content and number
Each Torah portion consists of two to six chapters to be read during the week. There are 54 weekly portions or parashot. Torah reading mostly follows an annual cycle beginning and ending on the Jewish holiday of Simchat Torah, with the divisions corresponding to the lunisolar Hebrew calendar, which contains up to 55 weeks, the exact number varying between leap years and regular years. One week is always Passover and another is always Sukkot, and the final parashah, V'Zot HaBerachah, is always read on Simchat Torah. Apart from the "immovable" final portion, there can be up to 53 weeks available for the other 53 portions. In years with fewer than 53 available weeks, some readings are combined to achieve the needed number of weekly readings.

The annual completion of the Torah readings on Simchat Torah, translating to "Rejoicing in the Law", is marked by Jewish communities around the world.

Name
Each weekly Torah portion takes its name from the first distinctive word in the Hebrew text of the portion in question, often from the first verse.

Practice: who, when, what
The appropriate parashah is chanted publicly.  In most communities, it is read by a designated reader (ba'al koreh) in Jewish prayer services, starting with a partial reading on the afternoon of Shabbat, the Jewish Sabbath, i.e. Saturday afternoon, again during the Monday and Thursday morning services, and ending with a full reading during the following Shabbat morning services (Saturday morning). The weekly reading is pre-empted by a special reading on major religious holidays. Each Saturday morning and holiday reading is followed by an often similarly themed reading (Haftarah) from the Book of Prophets (Nevi'im).

Origin
The custom dates to the time of the Babylonian captivity (6th century BCE). The origin of the first public Torah readings is found in the Book of Nehemiah, where Ezra the scribe writes about wanting to find a way to ensure the Israelites would not go astray again. This led to the creation of a weekly system to read the portions of the Torah at synagogues.

Alternative triennial cycle
In ancient times some Jewish communities practiced a triennial cycle of readings. In the 19th and 20th centuries, many congregations in the Reform and Conservative Jewish movements implemented an alternative triennial cycle in which only one-third of each weekly parashah was read in a given year; and this pattern continues. The parashot read are still consistent with the annual cycle, but the entire Torah is completed over three years. Orthodox Judaism does not follow this practice.

Differences between Israel and the diaspora
Due to different lengths of holidays in Israel and the Diaspora, the portion that is read on a particular week will sometimes not be the same inside and outside Israel.

Differences between communities
While the Parshyot divisions are fairly standardized, there are various communities with differing parsha divisions.  For example, many Yemenites combine Korach with the first half of Chukat and the second half of Chukat ("Vayis'u mi-kadesh") with Balak instead of combining Matot and Masei, and some Syrian communities combine Korach and Chukat instead of Matot and Masei. In Provence and Tunisia, Mishpatim and Im Kesef Talveh were occasionally divided so that Matot and Masei would always be read together.

Base for division into portions
The division of parashiot found in the modern-day Torah scrolls of all Ashkenazic, Sephardic, and Yemenite communities is based upon the systematic list provided by Maimonides in Mishneh Torah, Laws of Tefillin, Mezuzah and Torah Scrolls, Chapter 8. Maimonides based his division of the parashot for the Torah on the Masoretic text of the Aleppo Codex.

Table of weekly readings
In the table, a portion that may be combined with the following portion to compensate for the changing number of weeks in the lunisolar year, is marked with an asterisk. The following chart will show the weekly readings.

{| class="wikitable"
! Book !! Parsha name !! English equivalent !! Parsha Portion
|-
! rowspan=12|Bereshit (Genesis): 12
| Bereshit, בְּרֵאשִׁית || In the Beginning || Gen. 1:1-6:8
|-
| Noach, נֹחַ || Noah || 6:9-11:32
|-
| Lech-Lecha, לֶךְ-לְךָ || Go Forth! || 12:1-17:27
|-
| Vayeira, וַיֵּרָא || And He Appeared || 18:1-22:24
|-
| Chayei Sarah, חַיֵּי שָׂרָה || The Life of Sarah || 23:1-25:18
|-
| Toledot, תּוֹלְדֹת || Generations || 25:19-28:9
|-
| Vayetze, וַיֵּצֵא || And He Went Out || 28:10-32:3
|-
| Vayishlach, וַיִּשְׁלַח || And He Sent Out || 32:4-36:43
|-
| Vayeshev, וַיֵּשֶׁב || And He Settled || 37:1-40:23
|-
| Miketz, מִקֵּץ || At the End || 41:1-44:17
|-
| Vayigash, וַיִּגַּשׁ || And He Approached || 44:18-47:27
|-
| Vayechi, וַיְחִי || And He Lived || 47:28-50:26
|-
! rowspan=11 |Shemot' (Exodus): 11
| Shemot, שְׁמוֹת || Names || Ex. 1:1-6:1
|-
| Va'eira, וָאֵרָא || And I Appeared || 6:2-9:35
|-
| Bo, בֹּא || Come! || 10:1-13:16
|-
| Beshalach, בְּשַׁלַּח || When He Sent Out || 13:17-17:16
|-
| Yitro, יִתְרוֹ || Jethro || 18:1-20:22
|-
| Mishpatim, מִּשְׁפָּטִים || Laws || 21:1-24:18
|-
| Terumah, תְּרוּמָה || Donation || 25:1-27:19
|-
| Tetzaveh, תְּצַוֶּה || You Shall Command || 27:20-30:10
|-
| Ki Tisa, כִּי תִשָּׂא || When You Count || 30:11-34:35
|-
| *Vayakhel, וַיַּקְהֵל || And He Assembled || 35:1-38:20
|-
| Pekudei, פְקוּדֵי || Accountings || 38:21-40:38
|-
! rowspan=10 |Vayikra (Leviticus): 10
| Vayikra, וַיִּקְרָא || And He Called || Lev. 1:1-5:26
|-
| Tzav, צַו || Command! || 6:1-8:36
|-
| Shemini, שְּׁמִינִי || Eighth || 9:1-11:47
|-
| *Tazria, תַזְרִיעַ || She Bears Seed || 12:1-13:59
|-
| Metzora, מְּצֹרָע || Leprous || 14:1-15:33
|-
| *Acharei Mot, אַחֲרֵי מוֹת || After the Death || 16:1-18:30
|-
| Kedoshim, קְדֹשִׁים || Holy Ones || 19:1-20:27
|-
| Emor, אֱמֹר || Speak! || 21:1-24:23
|-
| *Behar, בְּהַר || On the Mount || 25:1-26:2
|-
| Bechukotai, בְּחֻקֹּתַי || In My Statutes || 26:3-27:34
|-
! rowspan=10 |Bemidbar (Numbers): 10
| Bamidbar, בְּמִדְבַּר || In the Wilderness || Num. 1:1-4:20
|-
| Naso, נָשֹׂא || Count! || 4:21-7:89
|-
| Behaalotecha, בְּהַעֲלֹתְךָ || When You Raise || 8:1-12:16
|-
| Shlach, שְׁלַח-לְךָ || Send Out! || 13:1-15:41
|-
| Korach, קֹרַח || Korach || 16:1-18:32
|-
| *Chukat, חֻקַּת || Statute || 19:1-22:1
|-
| Balak, בָּלָק || Balak || 22:2-25:9
|-
| Pinchas, פִּינְחָס || Phineas || 25:10-30:1
|-
| *Matot, מַּטּוֹת || Tribes || 30:2-32:42
|-
| Masei, מַסְעֵי || Journeys || 33:1-36:13
|-
! rowspan=11 |Devarim (Deuteronomy): 11
| Devarim, דְּבָרִים || Words || Deut. 1:1-3:22
|-
| Va'etchanan, וָאֶתְחַנַּן || And I Pleaded || 3:23-7:11
|-
| Eikev, עֵקֶב || As a Consequence || 7:12-11:25
|-
| Re'eh, רְאֵה || See! || 11:26-16:17
|-
| Shoftim, שֹׁפְטִים || Judges || 16:18-21:9
|-
| Ki Teitzei, כִּי-תֵצֵא || When You Go Out || 21:10-25:19
|-
| Ki Tavo, כִּי-תָבוֹא || When You Come In || 26:1-29:8
|-
| *Nitzavim, נִצָּבִים || Standing || 29:9-30:20
|-
| Vayelech, וַיֵּלֶךְ || And He Went || 31:1-31:30
|-
| Haazinu, הַאֲזִינוּ || Listen! || 32:1-32:52
|-
| V'Zot HaBerachah, וְזֹאת הַבְּרָכָה || And This Is the Blessing || 33:1-34:12
|}

See also

 Chumash
 Haftarah
 Hebrew cantillation
 Lectionary
 Sefer Torah
 Shnayim mikra ve-echad targum
 Tanakh
 Tikkun (book)
 Torah reading
 Weekly Maqam

References

External links

 Description of each weekly Torah portion. Aleph Beta.
 Links to the Hebrew text for weekly Torah portions. Hebcal Jewish Calendar''.
 Weekly Torah portion videos 
 The weekly parshah in Hebrew
 The weekly parsha in many languages and by famous rabbis

 
Jewish life cycle
Shacharit for Shabbat and Yom Tov